Thomas Birkett, 3rd Baron Birkett (born 25 July 1982) is a British hereditary peer, and photographer.

Tom Birkett married the ballerina Nathalie Harrison in 2014. Birkett succeeded his father in the family title in 2015, thus his wife is now formally styled The Lady Birkett. Also in 2015, he was admitted as a Freeman of the Curriers' Company.

Lord and Lady Birkett live in London WC1.

See also 
 The Royal Ballet

Arms

References

External links
 ThePeerage.com
 www.hereditarypeers.com

1982 births
Living people
Photographers from London
3
Place of birth missing (living people)